Brookdale Farm is a former Thoroughbred breeding and training farm located at 805 Newman Springs Road in the Lincroft section of Middletown Township in Monmouth County, New Jersey. Thomas Lloyd acquired the property in the late 18th century. In 1872, David Dunham Withers established the horse breeding and training operation. By 1889, the farm included . In 1968,  of the farm were bequeathed by Geraldine Morgan Thompson to the county to create Thompson Park.

History
In 1774, Thomas Lloyd bought  along the north bank of the Swimming River. By 1786, he had built a large house here. After his death in 1812, the property was divided and passed through several owners. In 1872, David Dunham Withers, active in the horse racing industry, bought  for his Brookdale Stable. In 1893, William Payne Thompson purchased the property. His son, Lewis, married Geraldine Morgan Thompson in 1896. They became full owners of the property by 1899.

Historic district

The Brookdale Farm Historic District is a  historic district encompassing the core part of the farm. It was added to the National Register of Historic Places on November 9, 2020, for its significance in agriculture, architecture and entertainment/recreation from 1786 to 1932. The district has 19 contributing buildings and one contributing site. Thomas Lloyd built his Georgian house in 1786. It was renovated and expanded in Colonial Revival style by Harry Whitney in 1914. The Lloyd Barn was likely built in the 18th century. It was later upgraded by Geraldine Thompson. The two-story Ten Mare Barn was likely built by David Withers in 1883. The two-story, forty-stall Training Stable measures  and is the largest building on the farm. Built starting , each section features a gabled cupola.

Notable horses
Championship horses bred and/or trained at Brookdale Farm include:
 Broomstick – winner of the Travers Stakes, 1904; a great sire
 Commando – winner of the Belmont Stakes, 1901
 Equipoise – the Brown Bullet of Brookdale, won ten races in 1932
 Peter Pan – winner of the Belmont Stakes, 1907
 Regret – first filly to win the Kentucky Derby, 1915
 Sysonby – won 14 of 15 starts 1904–1905
 Top Flight – won 12 of 16 starts in 1932, a record for fillies

See also
 National Register of Historic Places listings in Monmouth County, New Jersey
 National Museum of Racing and Hall of Fame
 New Jersey Women's Heritage Trail

References

External links 
 

Middletown Township, New Jersey
Horse farms in the United States
Buildings and structures in Monmouth County, New Jersey
American racehorse owners and breeders